The Virbhadra-Ellis lens equation  in astronomy and mathematics relates to the angular positions of an unlensed source , the image , the Einstein bending angle of light , and the angular diameter lens-source  and observer-source  distances.

.

This lens equation is useful for studying gravitational lensing in a strong gravitational field.

References

Gravitational lensing
Astrophysics
Equations of astronomy